St Catherine's Church, Dolný Kubín, is a Roman Catholic church in Slovakia.

The present Gothic church was built on the remnants of the first church of Dolný Kubín in the 14th century. The interior of the church was painted by "Slovenske umenie manifacture" in 1939. Paintings made by Edmund Maszanyi are from the same year. 

The 1622 epitaph of Job Zmeskal and his wife from 1622 is placed here as well as a picture of Saint Catherine from 1764. In 1886, the church was renovated.

Roman Catholic churches in Slovakia
Churches in Žilina Region